The St. Louis Freight Tunnel is a historic railroad tunnel beneath Washington Avenue and Eighth Street in downtown St. Louis, Missouri. Completed in 1874, it bypassed busy downtown streets between the Eads Bridge and the rail yards in the Mill Creek Valley. Today it carries MetroLink light rail trains.

History 

City leaders wanted a wagon bridge to the heart of the city to highlight downtown St. Louis. Economics required that it be a railroad bridge, but there was no space for railroads on downtown streets. Because of this a tunnel was authorized to connect the Eads Bridge to the Missouri Pacific Railroad to the south (and later to the new Union Station).

The designer of the Eads Bridge, James B. Eads, worked out the specifications for the tunnel. It would be a “cut and cover” tunnel 4,880 ft long, 30 ft below street level. Several problems arose during construction of the bridge and tunnel including design changes, inflated land and labor costs, and renegotiated contracts that escalated construction costs 46% over initial estimates. Despite this, the tunnel between the Eads Bridge and the Mill Creek Valley was completed by June 24, 1874 and the bridge would formally open less than a month later on July 4. A smokestack with a fan that pulled smoke from the tunnel was built near St. Charles Street and has since been demolished.

When it first opened, the tunnel had few users and had already been spun off as the St. Louis Tunnel Railroad Company led by William Taussig. Rail companies at the time did not have licenses to operate in Missouri and did not rush to get them. Because of this, in 1875, the company defaulted on its debts and a federal court appointed J.P. Morgan and Solon Humphreys as receivers. In 1875, Taussig would supervise the opening of the first Union Depot on Poplar Street, between 11th and 12th streets near the mouth of the tunnel. In 1878, the newly formed St. Louis Bridge Company purchased the bridge and tunnel out of bankruptcy for $2 million, about a third of its original cost, then transferred it in 1880 to interests controlled by Jay Gould. In 1889, Gould would be instrumental in the creation of the Terminal Railroad Association of St. Louis (TRRA). He died in 1892, but his involvement in the TRRA led to the construction of Union Station in 1894.

In 1974, due to the changing dimensions of railroad cars, the tunnel saw its last train; an Amtrak passenger train. Passenger and freight rail traffic then switched to the Merchants and MacArthur bridges.

Present day 

In 1971, regional transit planners identified the Airport/Central Corridor as the region's primary target for further transit study. In 1983, funding was approved to evaluate five mode alternatives, which culminated in a 1984 draft environmental impact statement. After a series of public hearings the East–West Gateway Council of Governments adopted light rail as the preferred mode alternative. In 1989, after it was determined the downtown portion would use the Eads Bridge and existing tunnel for light rail, the city of St. Louis swapped the MacArthur Bridge for the Eads Bridge with the Terminal Railroad Association. In 1991, rehabilitation began on the subway tunnel for MetroLink usage and reopened in 1993. In 1992, just east of the present day Convention Center station, a portion of the tunnel beneath Washington Avenue and Broadway collapsed, injuring no one.

Architecture 

The tunnel is notable for its intricate brick and stone construction. It's foundations are made up primarily of Aux Vases sandstone while the upper portion of the tunnel is constructed of brick barrel vaults. In the subway stations that were cut into the tunnel, the ends of the platforms are met with brick archways that complement the arch motif used throughout the MetroLink system.

Station listing

References 

MetroLink (St. Louis) infrastructure
Tunnels completed in 1874
Railway tunnels in Missouri